Dallas Tamaira or as he is better known, Joe Dukie, is the vocalist for the New Zealand group Fat Freddy's Drop. His stage name is inspired from his father Joe, also a singer, and his grandfather, a musician nicknamed Dukie after Duke Ellington. Tamaira is Māori. 

Dallas' style is greatly influenced by Bill Withers. Tamaira was awarded Best Vocalist at the bNet NZ Music Awards 2005. He made the comic strip on the cover and sleeve of Fat Freddy's Drop's EP Hope for a Generation (2004).

Discography

Solo (under the name "Dallas") 
 Better Than Change EP (The Drop, 1999)
 The Garden, on the compilation Styles Upon Styles Part Two (Sugarlicks, 2002)

With Bongmaster (Dallas, Iain Gordon, Mu, Antsmif) 
 Bongmaster, "Ground My Ego," Loop Select 003 (Loop, 2002)

With DJ Fitchie 
 Seconds" b/w "Grounded" (Especial, 2005)
 This Room [split 12" with Fat Freddy's Drop] (Best Seven, 2003)
 Midnight Marauders b/w dub version (Best Seven, 2002)
 Midnight Marauders b/w "Seconds" (The Drop, 2002)

 With Fat Freddy's Drop 
See Fat Freddy's Drop discography.

 Appearances on other artists' tracks 
 Tubbs, Five Day Night [w/New Chefs Mix and Baloo Mix] (Carbon, 2003)
 Tubbs, Falling (Carbon, 2003)
 Twinset, Sweet Thing (Loop, 2003)
 Markus Enochson, Follow Me (Vinyl Junkies, 2004)
 Del Rey System, Sweet Division (Bounce Records, 2005)
 Bongmaster Inc - Brothers & Sisters (2004)
 Shapeshifter, Long White Cloud (Truetone, 2004)
 Eva Be, No Memory of Time (Best Seven, 2004)
 Clara Hill, Flawless Part Two (Sonar Kollektiv, 2004)
 Tubbs, Five Day Night [w/Fat Freddy's Drop Mix and Baloo Mix] (Exceptional, 2005)
 Boozoo Bajou, Take It Slow (Studio !K7, 2005)
 Dutch Rhythm Combo, Venom (Pulver, 2005)
 Recloose, Dust (Peacefrog Records, 2005)
 Recloose, Time Is on Your Side (Peacefrog Records, 2005)
 The Nextmen, Did No Wrong (Antidote Records, 2007)
 The Nextmen, The Drop (Antidote Records, 2007)
 Recloose, Deeper Waters (Peacefrog Records, 2008)
 Pacific Heights, Peace (TruTone, 2008)
 Jazzanova, What Do You Want ?'', (Sonar Kollektiv, 2008)
 The Bamboos, "Venom" 
 Shapeshifter, "My Way", "Long White Cloud"
Julien Dyne, "Resolution" (Soundway Records, 2021)
The Upbeats, "Beams" (Vision Records, 2021)

References

External links
 Lambiek Comiclopedia article.

Living people
21st-century New Zealand male singers
New Zealand Māori male singers
New Zealand comics artists
Album-cover and concert-poster artists
Year of birth missing (living people)